John Charles William Fitzroy, 9th Duke of Grafton (1 August 1914 – 4 August 1936), was a British peer and politician, styled The Honourable John FitzRoy from 1914 to 1918, Viscount Ipswich in 1918, and Earl of Euston from 1918 to 1930.

Biography

FitzRoy was the eldest son of William FitzRoy, Viscount Ipswich (himself the eldest son of the 8th Duke of Grafton and his first wife, Margaret Rose Smith) and his wife Auriol Margaretta Brougham, and was educated at Trinity College, Cambridge. When his father died in a flying accident in April 1918 and when his great-grandfather died in December 1918, John FitzRoy became the heir to his grandfather's titles and succeeded to them in 1930.

In 1929 he gave away his mother on the occasion of her second marriage, to Major Gavin Hume-Gore.

The Duke died aged twenty-two, unmarried and childless, after his Bugatti crashed during the Limerick Grand Prix motor race in Limerick, Ireland. His dukedom was inherited by his cousin, Charles, but his viscountcy of Thetford and earldom and barony of Arlington fell into abeyance between his sisters, Lady Jane and Lady Mary-Rose. The viscountcy and earldom remain abeyant, but the abeyance of his barony was terminated in 1999, in favour of Lady Jane's eldest daughter, Jennifer.

External links 

Dukedom of Grafton

|-

1914 births
1936 deaths
109
Earls of Arlington
Alumni of Trinity College, Cambridge
Racing drivers who died while racing
Sport deaths in the Republic of Ireland
J